Robert Genin (born 11 August 1884 in Vysokoye near Klimovichi in the Region of Mogilev, now Belarus; died 16 August 1941 in Moscow) was a Russian artist, painter, draftsman, and illustrator of Jewish origin, who lived in the Russian Empire, Germany, France, Switzerland and the USSR.

Biography 
Born on 11 August 1884 in the family of a Jewish tradesman, Genin studied art in Vilna (1898-1900) and in Odessa (1900-1902).  At the end of 1902 he moved to Munich where for a couple of weeks he attended the school of Anton Ažbe.  In 1903, he moved to Paris, where he lived in La Ruche from 1905 to 1907. 
In Paris, he admired the art of Puvis de Chavannes, and many notable early works of Genin (until 1914) bear his influence.

In 1907, Genin returned to Munich and began to work for the magazine Jugend, where 40 of his illustrations were published.
In 1912, he became one of the founding members of the artists group Sema, and in 1913 became a member of the Münchener neue Secession.
The outbreak of the  First World War (1914-1918)  was a disastrous turn for this rise in the German art scene, and during the war Genin was interned in Munich as citizen of a hostile state.  After the war he moved to Berlin.

In 1919, Genin has acquired a small house in the fishering village of Ascona in Switzerland, where he subsequently spent several months each year.

Over the period of 1915-1926, the Genin's styles of painting and drawing developed in line with the direction of German expressionism.

In 1926, Genin undertook a voyage to the island of Bali, which provided important impulse to his work. 

In 1929, Genin moved to Paris.  There, his artistic style developed further under the influence of Fauvism and Neo-primitivism.

In 1936, Genin finally returned to the USSR, with the intention of taking an active part in building up the new socialist society by painting frescos on the walls of Moscow's new buildings. In March of that year, while Genin was already in Moscow, his first (and the last) American exhibition was held in NYC at Lilienfeld Galleries.

In Moscow, his first major commission was a fresco for one of the pavilions at the All-Union Agricultural Exhibition (VSKhV). However, in October 1938, the fresco has been covered up, in line with the political processes which had gained strength in the USSR. 
His second major commission in Moscow was frescoes for the Palace of Soviets, a commission which was terminated by the outbreak of the Second World War. Genin has committed suicide in August 1941, a few days after a devastating air raid by German bombers.

Monograph and catalogue-raisonné 
During his life, Genin did not take care of his works, their integrity and preservation. Some of them he destroyed by his own hands, and many were lost during the Second World War. During the Nazi era in Germany, some of his works were removed from museums along with other so called degenerate art, and others belonging to Jewish art collectors were confiscated. Those works which survived after Second World War are widely spread. Information about them is being collected by Friends club of Robert Genin with the aim of publishing the monograph and the catalogue-raisonné.

Solo exhibitions during his lifetime 
 1913, Munich, Moderne Galerie Thannhauser (with catalogue)
 1917, Munich, Moderne Galerie Thannhauser, 1st floor - paintings, 2nd floor - graphics (with catalogue)
 1922, Berlin, Alfred Flechtheim Galeries
 1928, Cologne, Kunstgewerbemuseum
 1931, Paris, Galerie Jacques Bonjean
 1932, Amsterdam, Galerie Kunstzalen A. Vecht
 1936, New York, Lilienfeld Galleries (with catalogue)

Major museum collections 
 Kunstmuseum Basel, Basel
 Ostdeutsche Galerie, Regensburg
 RGALI, Moscow
 Art Institute of Chicago, Chicago
 Pushkin Museum, Moscow
 Berlinische Galerie, Berlin
 Museum Ludwig, Cologne
 Von der Heydt Museum, Wuppertal
 Lenbachhaus, Munich
 Belarusian National Arts Museum, Minsk
 MOMA, New-York

Major publications about him 
 1914 Burger, Fritz. Robert Genin – München// Deutsche Kunst und Dekoration, 1914, 1, Heft 4, S. 288-296. (in German)
 1931 Fierens, Paul. Guenine or childhood regained// Formes, 1931, №19, p. 157-161. (versions in English and in French)
 2011 Родионов, Алексей. Художник Роберт Генин (1884-1941). Творчество и судьба// Бюллетень Музея Марка Шагала, 2011, №19-20, с. 137-156. (in Russian)
 2011 Fischer, Matthias. Der Briefwechsel mit Robert Genin// Sie lieber Herr Im Obersteg sind unser Schweizer für alles, Kunstmuseum Basel, 2011, S. 41-75. (in German)
 2013 Rodionov, Alexej. Robert Genin. Auf der Suche nach dem Paradies: Bali, 1926. St-Petersburg, 2013, 96 S. (versions in German and in Russian)
 2019 Robert Genin (1884-1941). Russischer Expressionist in München. Ausstellungskatalog. Hrsg. vom Schloßmuseum Murnau. 2019. 216 S. (versions in German or in Russian)

Gallery

References

External links 
 Friends club of Robert Genin

20th-century Russian painters
Russian male painters
1884 births
1941 deaths
1941 suicides
Painters who committed suicide
Suicides in Moscow
Suicides in the Soviet Union
20th-century Russian male artists